V/H/S/85 is an upcoming American found footage horror anthology film, and the sixth installment in the V/H/S franchise. The film features segments from David Bruckner, Scott Derrickson, Gigi Saul Guerrero, Natasha Kermani and Mike P. Nelson.

The film is scheduled to be released in 2023 by Shudder.

Production
In October 2022, Bloody Disgusting announced V/H/S/85 and that the film was secretly shot back-to-back alongside V/H/S/99. David Bruckner, Scott Derrickson, Gigi Saul Guerrero , Natasha Kermani and Mike P. Nelson will direct the segments while Josh Goldbloom, Brad Miska, Bruckner, Chad Villella, Matt Bettinelli-Olpin, Tyler Gillett and James Harris will produce the film.

Filming
Production was being filmed in secret, with a segment seemingly shot in April 2022. In October 2022, Scott Derrickson confirmed his segment was already filmed.

Release
V/H/S/85 is scheduled to be released in 2023 by Shudder.

References

External links
 

2023 films
2023 horror films
American anthology films
2020s monster movies
American horror films
American horror anthology films
2020s American films
Found footage films
Upcoming films
Films set in 1985
V/H/S (franchise)